Nationality words link to articles with information on the nation's poetry or literature (for instance, Irish or France).

Events
 April 15–June 4 – 1989 Tiananmen Square protests in Beijing (China): Poets are active in the events (see Collection of June Fourth Poems).
 June 2 – Dead Poets Society, a film incorporating excerpts from many traditional poets, ending with the title and opening line of Walt Whitman's lament on the death of Abraham Lincoln, "O Captain! My Captain!", is released in the United States
 November 10 – My Left Foot, a film about Christy Brown, the Irish poet, and based on his autobiography, is released

Works published in English
Listed by nation where the work was first published and again by the poet's native land, if different; substantially revised works listed separately:

Australia
 Robert Adamson The Clean Dark
 Les Murray, The Idyll Wheel
 Philip Salom: Barbecue of the Primitives. (University of Queensland) 
 Chris Wallace-Crabbe (Sangue e l'acqua, translated and edited into Italian by Giovann Distefano, Abano Terme:  Piovan Editore

Canada
 Margaret Avison, No Time (winner of the Governor General's Award for English language poetry in 1990
 C. Bayard, The New Poetics in Canada and Quebec (scholarship)
 Roo Borson, Intent, or, The Weight of the World,  American-Canadian
 Tim Lilburn, Tourist To Ecstasy, a finalist for the Governor General's Award, Canada
 Michael Ondaatje, The Cinnamon Peeler: Selected Poems, Canadian poet published in  the United Kingdom; London: Pan; New York: Knopf, 1991
 Michael Ondaatje and Linda Spalding, editors, The Brick Anthology, illustrated by David Bolduc, Toronto: Coach House Press

India, in English
 Nissim Ezekiel, Collected Poems ( Poetry in English ), Delhi, Oxford University Press
 Jayanta Mahapatra, Temple ( Poetry in English ), Sydney: Dangaroo Press
 Imtiaz Dharker, Purdah ( Poetry in English ),Oxford University Press, Delhi

Ireland
 Sebastian Barry, Fanny Hawke Goes to the Mainland Forever
 Dermot Bolger, Leinster Street Ghosts
 Eavan Boland, Selected Poems, including "Listen. This is the Noise of Myth" and "Fond Memory", Carcanet Press
 Ciaran Carson, Belfast Confetti, including "The Mouth" and "Hamlet", Oldcastle: The Gallery Press, 
 Eiléan Ní Chuilleanáin: The Magdalene Sermon, shortlisted for the Irish Times/Aer Lingus Award, Oldcastle: The Gallery Press, Ireland
 Denis Devlin, Collected Poems, including "Ank'hor Vat", "Little Elegy", "Memoirs of a Turcoman Diplomat: Oteli Asia Palas, Inc.", (see also Collected Poems 1964), Dedalus Press
 Thomas McCarthy, Seven Winters in Paris, Anvil Press, London, Ireland
 John Montague, New Selected Poems, including "Like Dolmens Round My Childhood, the Old People", "The Trout", "A Chosen Light", The Same Gesture", "Last Journey", "Dowager" and "Herbert Street Revisited", Oldcastle: The Gallery Press
 Matthew Sweeney, Blue Shoes, including "to the Building Trade", and "Tube Ride to Martha's"

United Kingdom
 Dannie Abse, White Coat, Purple Coat
 Fleur Adcock (New Zealand poet who moved to England in 1963), translator, Orient Express: Poems. Grete Tartler, Oxford and New York: Oxford University Press
 Simon Armitage, Zoom!
 Dermot Bolger, Leinster Street Ghosts, Irish poet published in the United Kingdom
 Gillian Clarke, Letting in the Rumour
 Donald Davie, To Scorch or Freeze
 Gavin Ewart, Penultimate Poems
 James Fenton, Manila Envelope, self-published book of poems
 Roy Fuller, Available for Dreams
 Alasdair Gray, Old Negatives
 Gerald Hammond, Fleeting Things: English Poets and Poems, 1616-1660, scholarship
The Blasphemers' Banquet by Tony Harrison 
 Selima Hill, The Accumulation of Small Acts of Kindness
 Ted Hughes, Wolfwatching
 Peter Levi, Shadow and Bone
 George MacBeth, Collected Poems 1958–1982
 E. A. Markham, editor, Hinterland: Caribbean Poetry from the West Indies and Britain
 Grace Nichols:
 Editor, Poetry Jump-Up, illustrated by Michael Lewis, Penguin (Harmondsworth, England); had been published as Black Poetry in 1988 by Blackie (London, England)
 Lazy Thoughts of a Lazy Woman, and Other Poems, Virago Press (London, England); published in 1990 by Random House (New York)
 Sean O'Brien, Boundary Beach  (Ulsterman Publications)
 Fiona Pitt-Kethley, The Perfect Man
 Peter Porter, Possible Worlds
 Pauline Prior-Pitt, Waiting Women
 J. H. Prynne, Word Order
 Peter Reading, Perduta Gente
 Vernon Scannell, Soldiering On
 Iain Crichton Smith, The Village, and Other Poems
 Charles Tomlinson, Annunciations
 Hugo Williams, Selected Poems, Oxford University Press

United States
 Joseph Payne Brennan, Look Back On Laurel Hills (Jwindz Publishing/Dwayne H. Olsen)
 Raymond Carver, A New Path To The Waterfall
 Henri Cole, The Zoo Wheel of Knowledge
 Ed Dorn, Abhorrences, Black Sparrow Press
 Rita Dove, Grace Notes
 W. S. Merwin and Soiku Shigematsu, translators, Sun at Midnight, poems by Musō Soseki
 Molly Peacock, Take Heart
 Charles Reznikoff, Poems 1918-1975: The Complete Poems of Charles Reznikoff, edited by Seamus Cooney (Black Sparrow Press)
 Michael Ryan, God Hunger, Viking Penguin
 Mary Jo Salter, Unfinished Painting, Knopf

Anthologies in the United States
 N. Baym, et al., editors, The Norton Anthology of American Literature, two volumes, third edition
Eugene England and Dennis Clark, editors, Harvest: Contemporary Mormon Poems, 328 pages. Signature Books, .
 M. Honey, editors, Shadowed Dreams: Women's Poetry of the Harlem Renaissance
 M. Harris and K. Aguero, editors, An Ear to the Ground

Poets included in The Best American Poetry 1989
Poems by these 75 poets were included in The Best American Poetry 1989, edited by David Lehman, with Donald Hall, guest editor:

A. R. Ammons
John Ashbery
Beth Bentley
Elizabeth Bishop
Robert Bly
Catherine Bowman
George Bradley
David Budbill
Michael Burkhard
Amy Clampitt
Tom Clark
Clark Coolidge
Douglas Crase
Robert Creeley
Peter Davison

David Dooley
Rita Dove
Stephen Dunn
Russell Edson
Daniel Mark Epstein
Elaine Equi
Aaron Fogel
Alice Fulton
Suzanne Gardinier
Debora Greger
Linda Gregg
Thom Gunn
Donald Hall
John Hollander
Paul Hoover

Marie Howe
Andrew Hudgins
Rodney Jones
Lawrence Joseph
Donald Justice
Vickie Karp
Jane Kenyon
Kenneth Koch
Phillis Levin
Philip Levine
Anne MacNaughton
Harry Mathews
Robert Mazzacco
James McCorkle
Robert McDowell

Wesley McNair
James Merrill
Thylias Moss
Sharon Olds
Mary Oliver
Steve Orlen
Michael Palmer
Bob Perelman
Robert Pinsky
Anna Rabinowitz
Mark Rudman
Yvonne Sapia
Lynda Schraufnagel
David Shapiro
Karl Shapiro

Charles Simic
Louis Simpson
W. D. Snodgrass
Gary Snyder
Elizabeth Spires
David St. John
William Stafford
George Starbuck
Patricia Storace
Mark Strand
Eleanor Ross Taylor
Jean Valentine
Richard Wilbur
Alan Williamson
Jay Wright

Criticism, scholarship and biography in the United States
Frederick Feirstein, editor, Expansive Poetry, various essays on the New Formalism and the related movement New Narrative, under the umbrella term "Expansive Poetry"
 Michele Leggott, Reading Zukofsky's 80 Flowers, Baltimore: Johns Hopkins University Press, (New Zealand writer; book published in the United States)
 A. Shucard, Modern American Poetry 1865-1950
 M. Davidson, The San Francisco Renaissance
 W. Kalaidjian, Languages of Liberation: The Social Text in Contemporary American Poetry

Other in English
 Norman Simms, Who's Writing and Why in the South Pacific, scholarship, New Zealand

Works published in other languages
Listed by nation where the work was first published and again by the poet's native land, if different; substantially revised works listed separately:

Arabic language
 Nizar Qabbani, Syrian;
 A Match in My Hand
 Petty Paper Nations
 No Victor Other Than Love

Denmark
 Inger Christensen, Denmark:
 Digt om døden ("Poem on Death")
 Lys og Græs ("Light and Grass")
 Klaus Høeck, Heptameron, publisher: Gyldendal; Denmark

French language
 Claude Esteban, Elégie de la mort violente, Flammarion; France
 Abdellatif Laabi, translator, Plus rares sont les roses, translated from the original Arabic of Mahmoud Darwich into French; Paris: Éditions de Minuit
 Jean Royer, Introduction à la poésie québécoise: Les poètes et les œuvres des origines à nos jours, Montréal: BQ; Canada

Hungary
 György Petri
 Ami kimaradt
 Valahol megvan

India
Listed in alphabetical order by first name:
 Anamika, Samay Ke Shahar Mein, Delhi: Parag Publications; Hindi-language
 Dileep Jhaveri, Pandukavyo ane Itar, Gujarati-language  
 Gagan Gill, Ek Din Lautegi Laraki, New Delhi: Rajkamal Prakashan, New Delhi, 1989, Bharatiya Jnanpith; Hindi-language
 Nirendranath Chakravarti, Jongole Ek Unmadini, Kolkata: Ananda Publishers; Bengali-language

Poland
 Juliusz Erazm Bolek, Prywatne zagrożenie
 Tymoteusz Karpowicz, Rozwiązywanie przestrzeni. Poemat polifoniczny ("Dissolving Space – A Polyphonic Poem")
 Wisława Szymborska: Poezje: Poems, bilingual Polish-English edition

Spain
 Matilde Camus:
 Santander en mi sentir ("Santander in my heart")
 Sin alcanzar la luz ("Without reaching the Light")

Other languages
 Nujoom Al-Ghanem, Masaa Al-Janah ("Evening of Heaven"), Emirati Arabic
 Christoph Buchwald, general editor, and Rolf Haufs, guest editor, Luchterhand Jahrbuch der Lyrik 1989/90 ("Poetry Yearbook 1989/90"), publisher: Luchterhand Literaturverlag; anthology; West Germany
 Alexander Mezhirov, Russia, Soviet Union:
 Бормотуха ("Bormotuha")
 Стихотворения ("Poems")
 Vladimir Vysotsky, Poėzii͡a i proza ("Poems and prose"), Russia songwriter and poet, Soviet Union
 Yu Jian, Shi liushi shou, China

Awards and honors

Australia
 C. J. Dennis Prize for Poetry: Gwen Harwood, Bone Scan
 Kenneth Slessor Prize for Poetry: John Tranter, Under Berlin
 Mary Gilmore Prize: Alex Skovron, The Re-arrangement

Canada
 Gerald Lampert Award: Sarah Klassen, Journey to Yalta
 Archibald Lampman Award: Patrick White, Habitable Planets
 1989 Governor General's Awards: Heather Spears, The Word for Sand (English); Pierre DesRuisseaux, Monème (French)
 Pat Lowther Award: Heather Spears, The Word for Sand
 Prix Alain-Grandbois: Jean Royer, Poèmes d'amour
 Dorothy Livesay Poetry Prize: Charles Lillard, Circling North
 Prix Émile-Nelligan: Élise Turcotte, La Terre est ici

New Zealand
 Jenny Bornholdt, Moving House
 Lauris Edmond, Hot October, autobiography
 Kendrick Smithyman, Selected Poems, edited by Peter Simpson, Auckland: Auckland University Press, New Zealand

United Kingdom
 Cholmondeley Award: Peter Didsbury, Douglas Dunn, E. J. Scovell
 Eric Gregory Award: Gerard Woodward, David Morley, Katrina Porteous, Paul Henry
 Queen's Gold Medal for Poetry: Allen Curnow

United States
 Agnes Lynch Starrett Poetry Prize: Nancy Vieira Couto, The Face in the Water
 Aiken Taylor Award for Modern American Poetry: Anthony Hecht
 AML Award for poetry Susan Elizabeth Howe for "Things in the Night Sky"
 Bernard F. Connors Prize for Poetry: Jorie Graham, "Spring"
 Frost Medal: Gwendolyn Brooks
 Lannan Literary Award for Poetry: Cid Corman, George Evans and Peter Levitt
 Pulitzer Prize for Poetry: Richard Wilbur: New and Collected Poems
 Ruth Lilly Poetry Prize: Mona Van Duyn
 Whiting Awards: Russell Edson, Mary Karr, C.D. Wright
 William Carlos Williams Award: Diane Wakoski, Emerald Ice: Selected Poems 1962-1987
 Fellowship of the Academy of American Poets: Richard Howard

Births
 March 9 – Chen Chen, Chinese-born American poet
 June 19 – Chris Tse, Canadian spoken word poet and hip hop artist
 June 21 – Jackie Hill-Perry, born Jackie Hill, American poet and hip hop artist
 Matt Abbott, English poet and performer

Deaths

Birth years link to the corresponding "[year] in poetry" article:
 January 4 – Srikrishna Alanahalli, 41 (born 1947), Indian Kannada-language novelist and poet
 January 13 – Sterling Allen Brown, 87 (born 1901), African-American poet, teacher and writer on folklore and of literary criticism
 January 22 – M. Govindan, 69 (born 1919), Indian, Malayalam-language poet
 February 28 – Richard Armour, 82, American poet and writer, of Parkinson's disease
 May 14 – Bhupi Sherchan, 53 (born 1935) Nepali poet
 June 19 – Betti Alver, 82 (born 1906), Estonian poet
 August 25 – Hans Børli, 70, Norwegian poet, novelist, and writer
 September 15 – Robert Penn Warren (born 1905), poet and writer, former U.S. Poet Laureate, of cancer
 October 12 – N. V. Krishna Warrier, 78 (born 1911), Indian, Malayalam-language poet, critic and scholar, introduced new types of long narrative poems and satires, editor of weekly Mathrubhumi, director of Kerala Bhasa Institute
 October 24 – Doris Huestis Speirs (born 1894), Canadian painter, ornithologist and poet
 December 4 – May Swenson, American poet and playwright
 December 22 – Samuel Beckett, Irish poet, playwright and novelist, winner of the Nobel Prize in 1969

See also

Poetry
List of years in poetry
List of poetry awards

References

20th-century poetry
Poetry